Sacred Rite was an American heavy metal band formed in Honolulu, Hawaii, in 1980. Sacred Rite is one of the two notable metal bands from Hawaii (alongside Hawaii). The group's self-titled debut album was released in Europe by Axe Killer Records, which helped build their fanbase and led to the band being an opening act for the Canadian rock band band Triumph during a tour show in Hawaii. The band relocated from Honolulu to Tulsa, Oklahoma in 1987. Drummer Kevin Lum left the band in 1988 due to complications from diabetes, and later died in 2002 as a result of heart failure.

Members and lineups

Last known lineup 

 Mark Kaleiwahea - vocals, guitar (1980-1989, 2007)
 Jimmy Dee Caterine - guitar (1980-1989, 2007)
 Peter Crane - bass (1980-1989, 2007)

Former members 

 Kevin Lum - drums (1980-1988) (died 2002)
 Scott Dickerson - drums (1988-1989)
 Robbie Littlejohn - Vocals (1980)

Discography
Ref:
 Sacred Rite (1984)
 The Ritual (1985)
 Is Nothing Sacred? (1986)
 Rites of Passage, Vol. 1 (best of/compilation), (2002)
 Rites of Passage, vol. 2 (best of/compilation), (2002)
 Rendezvous Leftovers (best of/compilation), (2003)
 SR-IV (best of/compilation), (2003)
 Live (2005)
 Resurrection (2007)

References

 https://www.rockhard.de/reviews/sacred-rite-is-nothing-sacred_222411.html
 https://www.rockhard.de/reviews/sacred-rite-the-ritual_226089.html
 https://rockhard.de/reviews/sacred-rite-resurrection_291861.htm

External links
Official website

Heavy metal musical groups from Hawaii
Musical quartets
Musical groups established in 1980